The 2019–20 Arab Club Champions Cup, officially named the 2019–20 Mohammed VI Champions Cup after Mohammed VI of Morocco, where the final was hosted, was the 29th season of the Arab Club Champions Cup, the Arab world's club football tournament organised by UAFA.

Étoile du Sahel were the defending champions, having won their first title in the previous edition. They were eliminated by Shabab Al-Ordon in the first round. The tournament was postponed for ten months in 2020 due to the COVID-19 pandemic, and the final was played on 21 August 2021, where Raja Casablanca defeated Al-Ittihad Jeddah on penalties after a 4–4 draw to earn their second title.

Teams
A total of 38 teams participated in the tournament; 19 from Africa and 19 from Asia. 8 clubs started in the preliminary round where two of them advanced to the first round which consisted of 32 teams. From then on, the tournament was played in a knockout format with home and away legs, until the final which is a one-leg match played at the Prince Moulay Abdellah Stadium in Rabat, Morocco.

Notes

Prize money
The prize money is as follows:
 Winners: $6,000,000
 Runners-up: $2,500,000
 Semi-finalists: $500,000
 Quarter-finalists: $200,000
 Second round: $50,000
 First round: $20,000

Round and draw dates

The schedule is as follows.

Preliminary round

Group A

Group B

Knockout stage

Bracket

First round
The draw for the first round was held on 27 July 2019.

Second round
The draw for the second round was held on 5 October 2019.

Quarter-finals
The draw for the quarter-finals was held on 4 December 2019.

Semi-finals
The draw for the semi-finals was held on 4 December 2019 (after the quarter-finals draw).

Final

The final was played on 21 August 2021 at the Prince Moulay Abdellah Stadium in Rabat, Morocco. The "home" team (for administrative purposes) was determined by an additional draw held after the quarter-final and semi-final draws.

Top goalscorers
Statistics exclude preliminary round.

Broadcasting

Notes

References

External links
UAFA Official website 

 
2019-20
2019 in Asian football
2019 in African football
2020 in Asian football
2019–20 in African football
Association football events postponed due to the COVID-19 pandemic